

Events

Works published
 Bostan, a book of poetry, is completed by Saadi

Births
 Cecco d'Ascoli (died 1327), Italian encyclopaedist, physician and poet

Deaths
 Yuan Haowen (born 1190), Chinese Sanqu poetry writer
 Lanfranc Cigala died 1257 or 1258 (born unknown), Genoese nobleman, knight, judge, and man of letters

13th-century poetry
Poetry